The Congressional-Executive Commission on China (CECC) is an independent agency of the U.S. government which monitors human rights and rule of law developments in the People's Republic of China. It was created in October 2001 under Title III of H.R. 4444, which authorizes normal trade relations with the PRC, and establishes a framework for relations between the two countries. The commission was given the mandate by the U.S. Congress to monitor and report on human rights issues with a particular focus on compliance with the International Covenant on Civil and Political Rights and the Universal Declaration of Human Rights. Its reporting covers developments in freedom of expression, the right to peaceful assembly, religious freedom, freedom of movement, freedom from arbitrary arrest and detention or torture, and the right to a fair trial, among others. The commission publishes an annual report to the President of the United States and Congress, typically in the fall of each year. It also maintains a database of prisoners of conscience, holds regular roundtables and hearings, and issues letters to other institutions concerning human rights matters.

The commission comprises a staff of researchers and analysts, and is overseen by as many as nine members each from the U.S. Senate and House of Representatives, as well as senior executive branch officials. Chairmanship of the commission rotates between the majority parties from the House and Senate. The commission is currently chaired by Jeff Merkley (D-OR).

Work

Annual report
The CECC publishes an annual report on human rights and rule of law development in China, usually in the fall of each year and covers issues such as freedom of expression, worker rights, religious freedom, ethnic minority rights, population planning, status of women, climate change and the environment, treatment of North Korean refugees, civil society, access to justice, and democratic governance. The reports draw on a variety of sources, including information from human rights groups, media reports, and official government or Communist Party of China documents.

Prisoner database
As part of its mandate from Congress, the CECC maintains a partial database of religious and political prisoners believed to be detained in China. As of 2013, the database contained over 7,300 names. Over 1,300 of these are believed to be detained currently, while the remainder have been released, killed, or escaped. The database was created with the assistance of the Dui Hua Foundation and Tibet Information Network.

Staff sanctioning by Chinese government
On December 23, 2022, Chinese Foreign Minister Wang Yi announced that Todd Stein, CECC deputy staff director, would be one of two individuals sanctioned by China with effect from the same day. The order specified that this was in retaliation to the United States having sanctioned two Chinese officials earlier that month over human rights issues in Tibet.

Commissioners

Commissioners, 116th Congress

Commissioners, 115th Congress

Commissioners, 114th Congress

Commissioners, 113th Congress

Commissioners, 112th Congress

Commissioners, 111th Congress

Commissioners, 110th Congress

Commissioners, 109th Congress

Commissioners, 108th Congress

Commissioners, 107th Congress

Historical leadership

See also 
 United States-China Economic and Security Review Commission

References

External links

Independent agencies of the United States government
Human rights organizations based in the United States
Human rights in China
United States national commissions
Foreign relations agencies of the United States
China–United States relations